UCOS may refer to:

 MicroC/OS-II, an operating system for microprocessors
 Unsolved Crime and Open case Squad, a fictional department of the Metropolitan Police in New Tricks (TV series)